Hashivar Rural District is a rural district (dehestan) in the Central District of Darab County, Fars Province, Iran. At the 2006 census, its population was 13,827, in 3,081 families.  The rural district has 31 villages.

References 

Rural Districts of Fars Province
Darab County